Thokchom Satyabrata Singh is a Bharatiya Janata Party politician from Manipur. He has been elected in Manipur Legislative Assembly election in 2017 and 2022 from Yaiskul constituency as candidate of Bharatiya Janata Party. He is the current Speaker of Manipur Legislative Assembly. 

He was the State Cabinet Minister for Consumer Affairs, Food & Public Distribution, Law & Legislative Affairs of Manipur, Labour & Employment.

References 

Bharatiya Janata Party politicians from Manipur
Manipur MLAs 2017–2022
Manipur MLAs 2022–2027
1974 births
Living people
Manipur University alumni